Võnnu is a small borough in Tartu County, in Kastre Parish Estonia. Võnnu has a population of 552 (2011).

Võnnu was the administrative centre of Võnnu Parish.

Võnnu village and manor were first mentioned in 1341 as Wenden.

Notable sites

Jacob's Church of the Estonian Evangelical Lutheran Church (originally constructed, 1232–1236) has been rebuilt several times, and is one of the largest churches in the Estonian countryside.

Notable people
Carl Eduard Körber (1802–1883), pastor and writer
Martin Körber (1817–1893), pastor, composer, writer and choir leader
Gustav Suits (1883–1956), poet; was born in Võnnu

References

External links
Kastre Parish 

Boroughs and small boroughs in Estonia
Kreis Dorpat